Heber is both an Irish masculine given name and an etymologically unrelated Biblical name. The Irish name is an Anglicisation of the Irish Gaelic Éibhear. The Biblical name means "enclave" in Hebrew; and was used by several minor characters in the Bible.

Heber
 Heber Blankenhorn, journalist, labor activist, and decorated PSYOPS officer
 Heber J. Grant, seventh President of The Church of Jesus Christ of Latter-day Saints
 Heber Jentzsch, President of the Church of Scientology International
 Heber C. Kimball, Apostle in The Church of Jesus Christ of Latter-day Saints
 Héber Araujo dos Santos, Brazilian footballer currently playing for New York City FC
 Heber Slatter, English footballer
 Heber Curtis, American Astronomer

See also
List of Irish-language given names
 Herber

References

Irish masculine given names